Jalen Christopher Beeks (born July 10, 1993) is an American professional baseball pitcher for the Tampa Bay Rays of Major League Baseball (MLB). The Boston Red Sox selected Beeks in the 12th round of the 2014 MLB draft. He made his MLB debut in 2018 for the Red Sox.

Career

Amateur
Beeks attended Prairie Grove High School in Prairie Grove, Arkansas, graduating in 2011.

He enrolled at Crowder College, and transferred to the University of Arkansas, where he played college baseball for the Arkansas Razorbacks. A reliable reliever during the 2013 season, Beeks allowed the game-tying and go-ahead runs on consecutive wild pitches during an intentional walk in the 7th inning against the Kansas State Wildcats in the Manhattan Regional. The Razorbacks were eliminated from the postseason following the 4–3 loss.

After the 2013 season, he played collegiate summer baseball with the Harwich Mariners of the Cape Cod Baseball League, and was named a league all-star. Beeks returned to Arkansas for the 2014 season as the opening day starter, starting 13 games with a 6–4 record and 1.98 earned run average (ERA).

Boston Red Sox
The Boston Red Sox selected Beeks in the 12th round of the 2014 MLB draft. He signed and made his debut that same year for the GCL Red Sox, pitching five scoreless innings. In 2015, he pitched for the Greenville Drive of the Class A South Atlantic League, where he had a 9–7 win–loss record with a 4.32 earned run average (ERA) in 26 starts, and in 2016, he pitched both for the Salem Red Sox of the Class A-Advanced Carolina League and Portland Sea Dogs of the Class AA Eastern League, compiling a combined 9–8 record and 3.87 ERA in 26 starts.

In 2017, Beeks played for Portland and the Pawtucket Red Sox of the Class AAA International League. The Red Sox named him their Minor League Pitcher of the Year after he posted a combined 11–8 record, 3.29 ERA, and 1.21 WHIP in 26 games started between the two teams. The Red Sox added Beeks to their 40-man roster after the 2017 season. He began the 2018 season with Pawtucket.

Beeks was promoted to Boston's active roster on June 7, 2018, in order to make his MLB debut in a start against the Detroit Tigers. Beeks gave up five first-inning runs and took the loss; he was optioned back to Pawtucket the next day. Beeks was recalled to Boston on July 10; he pitched  innings that day, allowing four hits and three runs, and was then returned to Triple-A.

Tampa Bay Rays
On July 25, 2018, Beeks was traded to the Tampa Bay Rays in exchange for right-handed pitcher Nathan Eovaldi. With the Rays, Beeks made 12 appearances through the end of the season, compiling a 5–0 record with a 4.47 ERA and 37 strikeouts in  innings.

Beeks began the 2019 season with Tampa Bay. He was optioned to the Triple-A Durham Bulls on June 28, and was recalled on July 16. He finished the season with a 6–3 record, 4.31 ERA, 1.49 WHIP and 89 strikeouts over  innings at the MLB level.

On August 25, 2020, Beeks tore his ulnar collateral ligament while pitching against the Baltimore Orioles, ending his season and requiring Tommy John surgery. On February 17, 2021, Beeks was placed on the 60-day injured list as he continued to recover from Tommy John surgery.

On March 22, 2022, Beeks signed a $0.75 million contract with the Rays, avoiding salary arbitration.

On June 4, 2022, Beeks, along with 4 other Rays teammates, opted out of wearing a Rays team logo and cap in support of LGBTQ+ Pride, during the team's annual Pride Night celebration at Tropicana Field.

Personal
Beeks and his wife, Brie, have a son and a daughter. The family resides in Northwest Arkansas.

References

Further reading

External links

Living people
1993 births
Sportspeople from Fayetteville, Arkansas
Baseball players from Arkansas
Major League Baseball pitchers
Boston Red Sox players
Tampa Bay Rays players
Crowder Roughriders baseball players
Arkansas Razorbacks baseball players
Gulf Coast Red Sox players
Greenville Drive players
Salem Red Sox players
Portland Sea Dogs players
Pawtucket Red Sox players
Durham Bulls players
Surprise Saguaros players
Harwich Mariners players